Ayling is a surname belonging to:

Cyril Ayling (1910–1993), Argentine cricketer
Dennet Ayling (1906–1987), Argentine cricketer, brother of Cyril Ayling
George Ayling (1919-1964), British soldier and cricket umpire
Joan Ayling (1907–1993), British artist
Jon Ayling (born 1967), English retired cricketer
Louise Ayling (born 1987), New Zealand rower
Luke Ayling (born 1991), English footballer
Robert Ayling (born 1946), British businessman, former chief executive of British Airways
Robert Ayling (cricketer), English cricketer known to have played two matches in 1796
William Ayling (1766–1826), English cricketer
William Ayling (judge) (1867–1946), English judge